The Battle of Caporetto (also known as the Twelfth Battle of the Isonzo or the Battle of Karfreit as it was known by the Central Powers), took place from 24 October to 19 November 1917, near the town of Kobarid (now in Slovenia), on the Austro-Italian front of World War I. The battle was named after the Italian name of the town of Kobarid (known as Karfreit in German).

Italian Army

Outline order of battle

Detailed order of battle 
Italian 2nd Army (Lieutenant General Luigi Capello)

In 1st line:

 IV Corps (Lieutenant General Alberto Cavaciocchi)
 50th Infantry Division (Major General Giovanni Arrighi)
 "Friuli" Brigade – 87th and 88th Infantry Regiments
 Part of "Foggia" Brigade – 280th Infantry Regiment
 Alpini battalions "Borgo San Dalmazzo", "Dronero" and "Saluzzo"
 2nd Alpini Group ("Ceva", "Mondovì" and "Monviso" battalions)
 43rd Infantry Division (Lieutenant General Angelo Farisoglio)
 "Genova" Brigade – 97th and 98th Infantry Regiments
 Part of "Etna" Brigade – 223rd Infantry Regiment
 5th Alpini Group ("Monte Albergian", "Val Chisone" and "Belluno" battalions)
 9th Bersaglieri Regiment
 46th Infantry Division (Lieutenant General Giulio Amadei)
 "Caltanissetta" Brigade – 147th and 148th Infantry Regiments
 "Alessandria" Brigade – 155th and 156th Infantry Regiments
 Part of "Etna" Brigade – 224th Infantry Regiment
 2nd Bersaglieri Regiment
 34th Infantry Division, Corps reserve
 Part of "Foggia" Brigade – 281st and 282nd Infantry Regiments
 "Monte Argentera" Alpini battalion
 XXVII Corps (Lieutenant General Pietro Badoglio)
 19th Infantry Division (Major General Giovanni Villani)
 "Napoli" Brigade – 75th and 76th Infantry Regiments
 "Spezia" Brigade – 125th and 126th Infantry Regiments
 "Taro" Brigade – 207th and 208th Infantry Regiments (less 1 bn.)
 65th Infantry Division
 Part of "Belluno" Brigade – 274th Infantry Regiment, I and II/275th Infantry Regiment
 22nd Infantry Division
 "Pescara" Brigade – 211th and 212th Infantry Regiments
 64th Infantry Division
 Part of "Belluno" Brigade – 276th Infantry Regimentt, III/275th Infantry Regiment
 Part of "Taro" Brigade – II/208th Infantry Regiment
 Corps reserve:
 10th Alpini Group ("Vicenza", "Monte Berico", "Morbegno" and "Val d'Adige" battalions)
 "Puglie" Brigade – 71st and 72nd Infantry Regiments (already in line)
 "Roma" Brigade – 79th and 80th Infantry Regiments (already in line)
 XXIV Corps (Lieutenant General Enrico Caviglia)
 49th Infantry Division
 "Ravenna" Brigade – 37th and 38th Infantry Regiments
 "Lambro" Brigade – 205th and 206th Infantry Regiments (on the morning of 24 October, transferred to XIV Corps, replaced by "Palermo" Brigade)
 "Sele" Brigade – 219th and 220th Infantry Regiments
 68th Infantry Division
 "Grosseto" Brigade – 237th and 238th Infantry Regiments
 10th Infantry Division
 "Verona" Brigade – 83rd and 84th Infantry Regiments
 "Campobasso" Brigade – 229th and 230th Infantry Regiments
 II Corps (Major General Alberico Albricci)
 67th Infantry Division
 "Cremona" Brigade – 21st and 22nd Infantry Regiments
 "Tortona" Brigade – 257th and 258th Infantry Regiments
 44th Infantry Division
 "Re" Brigade – 1st and 2nd Infantry Regiments
 "Brescia" Brigade – 19th and 20th Infantry Regiments
 8th Infantry Division
 "Udine" Brigade – 95th and 96th Infantry Regiments
 "Forlì" Brigade – 43rd and 44th Infantry Regiments
 Corps reserve:
 "Aquila" Brigade – 269th and 270th Infantry Regiments
 VI Corps (Lieutenant General Giacomo Lombardi)
 66th Infantry Division
 "Cuneo" Brigade – 7th and 8th Infantry Regiments
 "Abruzzi" Brigade – 57th and 58th Infantry Regiments
 "Milano" Brigade – 159th and 160th Infantry Regiments (tactically available to the army and detached to XXVIII Corps)
 24th Infantry Division
 "Emilia" Brigade – 119th and 120th Infantry Regiments
 "Gaeta" Brigade – 263rd and 264th Infantry Regiments
 VIII Corps (Major General Francesco Grazioli)
 48th Infantry Division
 "Piemonte" Brigade – 3rd and 4th Infantry Regiments
 "Porto Maurizio" Brigade – 253rd and 254th Infantry Regiments
 59th Infantry Division
 "Modena" Brigade – 41st and 42nd Infantry Regiments
 "Pesaro" Brigade – 239th and 240th Infantry Regiments
 7th Infantry Division
 "Bergamo" Brigade – 25th and 26th Infantry Regiments
 "Lucca" Brigade – 163rd and 164th Infantry Regiments
 "Sesia" Brigade – 201st and 202nd Infantry Regiments (fortified town of Gorizia, tactically available to the army)

In 2nd line:

 VII Corps (Major General Luigi Bongiovanni)
 3rd Infantry Division
 "Arno" Brigade – 213th and 214th Infantry Regiments
 "Elba" Brigade – 261st and 262nd Infantry Regiments
 62nd Infantry Division
 "Salerno" Brigade – 89th and 90th Infantry Regiments
 IV Bersaglieri Brigade – 14th Bersaglieri Regiment and 20th Bersaglieri Regiment
 Corps reserve:
 "Firenze" Brigade – 127th and 128th Infantry Regiments
 XIV Corps (Lieutenant General Sagramoso) – Army Reserve Command
 20th Infantry Division
 "Livorno" Brigade – 33rd and 34th Infantry Regiments
 "Palermo" Brigade – 67th and 68th Infantry Regiments
 30th Infantry Division
 "Treviso" Brigade – 115th and 116th Infantry Regiments
 "Girgenti" Brigade – 247th and 248th Infantry Regiments
 XXVIII Corps (Major General Saporiti) – Army Reserve Command
 23rd Infantry Division
 "Venezia" Brigade – 83rd and 84th Infantry Regiments
 "Messina" Brigade – 93rd and 94th Infantry Regiments
 "Sassari" Brigade – 151st and 152nd Infantry Regiments
 "Avellino" Brigade – 231st and 232nd Infantry Regiments
 47th Infantry Division
 I Bersaglieri Brigade – 6th Bersaglieri Regiment and 12th Bersaglieri Regiment
 V Bersaglieri Brigade – 4th Bersaglieri Regiment and 21st Bersaglieri Regiment
 "Milano" Brigade – 159th and 160th Infantry Regiments (detached from the 66th Infantry Division, VI Corps)
 Reserves of the Supreme Command 
 60th Infantry Division (attached to VIII Corps)
 "Ferrara" Brigade – 47th and 48th Infantry Regiments
 "Taranto" Brigade – 143rd and 144th Infantry Regiments
 53rd Infantry Division (attached to XIV Corps)
 "Vicenza" Brigade – 227th, 228th and 229th Infantry Regiments
 "Potenza" Brigade – 271st, 272nd and 273rd Infantry Regiments
 13th Infantry Division (attached to XXVIII Corps)
 "Jonio" Brigade – 221st and 222nd Infantry Regiments
 "Massa Carrara" Brigade – 251st and 252nd Infantry Regiments
 "Teramo" Brigade – 241st and 242nd Infantry Regiments (attached to XXVIII Corps)

German and Austro-Hungarian Armies

Outline order of battle

Secondary attacks 

 South Tyrolean Army Group (Franz Conrad von Hötzendorf)
 10th Army (Alexander von Krobatin)
 11th Army (Viktor Graf von Scheuchenstuel)
 XX Army Corps (Josef Roth)
 Gruppe Erzherzog Peter Ferdinand (Archduke Peter Ferdinand of Austria)

Detailed order of battle 

German 14th Army (General der Infanterie Otto von Below)

Austro-Hungarian I Corps (Group Krauss – General der Infanterie Alfred Krauß) 
Austro-Hungarian 3rd Infantry Division "Edelweiss" (Generalmajor Heinrich Wieden Edler von Alpenbach)
 216th Infantry Brigade
 59th Infantry Regiment "Erzherzog Rainer"
 4th Kaiserjäger Regiment (1 bn. only)
 217th Infantry Brigade
 14th Infantry Regiment "Ernst Ludwig Großherzog von Hessen und bei Rhein"
 3rd Kaiserjäger Regiment
Austro-Hungarian 22nd Schützen Division (Generalmajor Rudolf Müller)
 4th Schützen Brigade
 III Kaiserschützen Regiment "Innichen" (less 1 bn.)
 26th Schützen Regiment "Marburg"
 98th Schützen Brigade 
 I Kaiserschützen Regiment "Trient"
 II Kaiserschützen Regiment "Bozen" 
Austro-Hungarian 55th Infantry Division (Generalmajor Felix Prinz zu Schwarzenberg)
 55th Sturmbataillon
 26th Mountain Infantry Brigade
 4th Bosnia/Herzegovina Infantry Regiment
 7th Infantry Regiment "Graf von Khevenhüller"
 38th Infantry Brigade
 2nd Bosnia/Herzegovina Infantry Regiment
 4th Bosnia/Herzegovina Infantry Regiment (1 bn. only)
 7th Infantry Regiment "Graf von Khevenhüller" (1 bn. only)
German Jäger Division (Colonel von Wodkte) 
 5th Ersatz Infantry Brigade
11th Jäger Regiment
Staff of 4th Dragoons Regiment
Guards Reserve Jäger Battalion
Guards Reserve Schützen Battalion
1st Jäger Battalion
12th Jäger Regiment
Staff of 2nd Uhlans Regiment
2nd Jäger Battalion
7th Jäger Battalion
1st Reserve Jäger Battalion
13th Jäger Regiment
Staff of 8th Bavarian Chevaulégers Regiment
8th Reserve Jäger Battalion
20th Reserve Jäger Battalion
21st Reserve Jäger Battalion
Sturmbataillon "Kronprinz Rupprecht" (Bavaria)
Sturmbataillon "Deutscher Kronprinz" (Bavaria)
Sturmbataillon "Herzog Albrecht" (Bavaria)
Württemberg Mountain Battalion, (later detached to the Alpenkorps)
III Bavarian Corps (Group Stein – Generalleutnant Hermann Freiherr von Stein) 
Austro-Hungarian 50th Infantry Division (Generalmajor Karl Geřabek) 
 3rd Mountain Infantry Brigade
 30th Infantry Regiment "Schoedler" (1 bn. only)
 33rd Infantry Regiment "Kaiser Leopold II" (1 bn. only)
 46th Infantry Regiment (1 bn. only)
 80th Infantry Regiment "Wilhelm Ernst Großherzog von Sachsen-Weimar-Eisenach, Herzog zu Sachsen" (1 bn. only)
 25th Feldjäger Battalion
 155th Landsturm Regiment 
 15th Mountain Infantry Brigade
 1st Bosnia/Herzegovina Infantry Regiment (less 1 bn.)
 18th Infantry Regiment "Erzherzog Leopold Salvator" (1 bn. only)
 37th Infantry Regiment "Erzherzog Joseph" (1 bn. only)
 61st Infantry Regiment "Ritter von Frank" (1 bn. only)
German 12th Infantry Division (Generalmajor Arnold Lequis) 
 24th Infantry Brigade
 23rd (2nd Upper Silesian) Infantry Regiment "von Winterfeldt"
 62nd (3rd Upper Silesian) Infantry Regiment 
 63rd (4th Upper Silesian) Infantry Regiment 
German 117th Infantry Division (Generalmajor Paul Seydel) 
 233rd Infantry Brigade
157th (4th Silesian) Infantry Regiment
11th Reserve Infantry Regiment
22nd Reserve Infantry Regiment
German Alpenkorps (Generalmajor Ludwig von Tutschek)
1st Bavarian Jäger Brigade
Royal Bavarian Infantry Lifeguards Regiment
1st Bavarian Jäger Regiment
1st Bavarian Jäger Battalion "King"
2nd Bavarian Jäger Battalion 
2nd Bavarian Reserve Jäger Battalion 
2nd Jäger Regiment
10th Jäger Battalion 
10th Reserve Jäger Battalion 
14th Reserve Jäger Battalion
German 51st Corps (Group Berrer – Generalleutnant Albert von Berrer to 28 October 1917 then von Hofacker)
German 26th (1st Württemberg) Infantry Division (Generalleutnant Eberhard von Hofacker)   
51st Infantry Brigade
119th (1st Württemberg) Grenadier Regiment "Queen Olga"
121st (3rd Württemberg) (Old Württemberg) Infantry Regiment
125th (7th Württemberg) Infantry Regiment "Emperor Frederick, King of Prussia"
German 200th Infantry Division (Generalmajor Hans von Below) 
2nd Jäger Brigade
3rd Jäger Regiment
1st (Bavarian) Ski Battalion 
2nd Ski Battalion 
3rd Ski Battalion 
4th (Bavarian) Ski Battalion 
4th Jäger Regiment
11th Jäger Battalion 
5th Reserve Jäger Battalion 
6th Reserve Jäger Battalion 
5th Jäger Regiment
17th Reserve Jäger Battalion 
18th Reserve Jäger Battalion 
23rd Reserve Jäger Battalion
Austro-Hungarian XV Corps (Group Scotti – Feldmarschalleutnant Karl Scotti) 
Austro-Hungarian 1st Infantry Division (Feldmarschalleutnant Joseph Metzger) 
7th Mountain Infantry Brigade
5th Infantry Regiment "Freiherr von Klobucar" (1 bn. only)
25th Infantry Regiment "Edler von Pokorny" (1 bn. only)
53rd Infantry Regiment "Dankl" (1 bn. only)
66th Infantry Regiment "Erzherzog Peter Ferdinand" (1 bn. only)
86th Infantry Regiment "Freiherr von Steininger" (1 bn. only)
3rd Bosnia/Herzegovina Feldjäger Battalion
22nd Mountain Infantry Brigade
4th Bosnia/Herzegovina Infantry Regiment (1 bn. only)
17th Feldjäger Battalion
31st Feldjäger Battalion
37th Schützen Regiment "Gravosa" (2 bns.)
92nd Infantry Regiment "Edler von Hortstein"
German 5th Infantry Division (Generalmajor Hasso Georg von Wedel) 
10th Infantry Brigade
8th (1st Brandenburg) Life Grenadier Regiment "King Frederick William III"
12th (2nd Brandenburg) Grenadier Regiment "Prince Charles of Prussia"
52nd (6th Brandenburg) Infantry Regiment "von Alvensleben"
Army Reserve 
Austro-Hungarian 4th Infantry Division (Generalmajor Rudolf Pfeffer) 
7th Infantry Brigade
88th Infantry Regiment
99th Infantry Regiment
8th Infantry Brigade
8th Infantry Regiment "Erzherzog Karl Stephan"
49th Infantry Regiment "Freiherr von Hess"
Austro-Hungarian 13th Schützen Division (Feldmarschalleutnant Franz Kalser Edler von Maasfeld) 
25th Schützen Brigade
1st Schützen Regiment "Wien"
24th Schützen Regiment "Wien"
26th Schützen Brigade
14th Schützen Regiment "Brünn"
25th Schützen Regiment "Kremsier"
Austro-Hungarian 33rd Infantry Division (Generalmajor Artur Iwański) 
65th Infantry Brigade
19th Infantry Regiment "Erzherzog Franz Ferdinand"
36th Infantry Regiment "Reichsgraf Browne"
66th Infantry Brigade
12th Infantry Regiment "Parmann"
83rd Infantry Regiment "Freiherr von Schikovsky"
Later reinforcements to the 14th Army 
Austro-Hungarian 35th Infantry Division (Feldmarschalleutnant Eugen von Podhoránszky) (from 2nd Isonzo Army) 
69th Infantry Brigade
51st Infantry Regiment "von Boroeviċ"
63rd Infantry Regiment "Freiherr von Pitreich"
70th Infantry Brigade
62nd Infantry Regiment "Ludwig III, König von Bayern"
64th Infantry Regiment "Ritter von Auffenberg"
Austro-Hungarian 94th Infantry Division (Generalmajor Marcel Ławrowski Edler von Plöcken) 
Group Lesachtal
148th Landsturm Battalion
Salzsburg Volunteer Schützen Battalion
Styria Volunteer Schützen Battalion
25th Mountain Infantry Brigade
18th Schützen Regiment "Przemyšl" (1 bn. only)
8th Feldjäger Battalion
??? Ersatz Feldjäger Battalion
26th Landsturm Regiment (1 bn. only)
30th Landsturm Battalion
57th Mountain Infantry Brigade
26th Landsturm Regiment (2 bns.)
151st Landsturm Battalion
157th Landsturm Battalion
???th Sturmbataillon

Army Group "Boroević" (Generaloberst Svetozar Boroević)
Austro-Hungarian 2nd Isonzo Army (part) (General der Infanterie Johann Ritter von Henriquez)

Austro-Hungarian Group Kosak (Feldmarschalleutnant Ferdinand Kosak)
Austro-Hungarian 60th Infantry Division (Feldmarschalleutnant Ludwig Goiginger) 
2nd Mountain Infantry Brigade
8th Infantry Regiment "Erzherzog Karl Stephan" (1 bn. only)
52nd Infantry Regiment "Erzherzog Friedrich" (1 bn. only)
55th Infantry Regiment (1 bn. only)
70th Infantry Regiment "Edler von Appel" (1 bn. only)
12th Feldjäger Battalion
8th Bosnia/Herzegovina Feldjäger Battalion
10th Mountain Infantry Brigade
20th Infantry Regiment "Heinrich Prinz von Preußen" (1 bn. only)
21st Infantry Regiment "Graf von Abensperg und Traun" (1 bn. only)
47th Infantry Regiment "Graf von Beck-Rzikowsky" (1 bn. only)
90th Infantry Regiment "Edler von Horsetzky" (1 bn. only)
1st Bosnia/Herzegovina Feldjäger Battalion
4th Bosnia/Herzegovina Feldjäger Battalion
Austro-Hungarian 35th Infantry Division (Feldmarschalleutnant Eugen von Podhoránszky) (later to 14th Army) 
69th Infantry Brigade
51st Infantry Regiment "von Boroevic"
63rd Infantry Regiment "Freiherr von Pitreich
70th Infantry Brigade
62nd Infantry Regiment "Ludwig III, König von Bayern"
64th Infantry Regiment "Ritter von Auffenberg"
Austro-Hungarian 57th Infantry Division (Generalmajor Joseph Hrozný Edler von Bojemil) 
5th Infantry Brigade
22nd Infantry Regiment "Graf von Lacy" (less 1 Bn.)
57th Infantry Regiment "Prinz zu Sachsen-Coburg-Saalfeld"
2nd Landsturm Regiment (1 bn. only)
18th Infantry Brigade
87th Infantry Regiment "Freiherr von Succovaty"
34th Infantry Regiment "Wilhelm I, Deutscher Kaiser und König von Preußen" (1 bn. only)
69th Infantry Regiment "Freiherr von Leithner" (1 bn. only)
8th Feldjäger Battalion

References

Bibliography 
 
 
 

World War I orders of battle
Battles of World War I involving Austria-Hungary
Battles of World War I involving Germany
Battles of World War I involving Italy